Crenata is the feminine form of Latin crenatus ("with blunt teeth"), and can be found in a number of scientific names, among them the following:

Plants 
 Marsilea crenata	, a fern
 Orobanche crenata	, a parasite plant in Orobanchaceae
 Stevia crenata	, a plant in Asteraceae
 Calceolaria crenata	, a plant in Calceolariaceae
 Melanophylla crenata	, a plant in Melanophyllaceae
 Ardisia crenata	, a plant in Myrsinaceae
 Eugenia crenata	, a plant in Myrtaceae
 Cyrtandra crenata	, a plant in Gesneriaceae
 Rinorea crenata	, a plant in Violaceae
 Rhus crenata	, a bush in Anacardiaceae
 Ilex crenata	, a bush in Aquifoliaceae
 Hyptis crenata	, a bush in Lamiaceae
 Fagus crenata	, a tree in Fagaceae
 Castanea crenata	, a tree in Fagaceae
 Scolopia crenata	, a tree in Salicaceae
 Picrasma crenata	, a tree in Simaroubaceae

Animals

Gasteropods 
 Liotina crenata	, a sea snail
 Turbonilla crenata	, a sea snail
 Mitra crenata	, a sea snail
 Harpa crenata	, a sea snail
 Amphibola crenata	, an amphibian snail
 Conturbatia crenata	, a land snail

Insects 
 Gluphisia crenata	, a moth
 Apamea crenata	, a moth
 Likoma crenata	, a moth
 Urodeta crenata	, a moth
 Eupithecia crenata	, a moth
 Aeshna crenata	, a dragonfly